This is a listing of the horses that finished in either first, second, or third place and the number of starters in the Native Dancer Stakes (1966-present), an American Thoroughbred Stakes race at seven furlongs run on dirt at Laurel Park Racecourse  in Laurel, Maryland.

A # designates that the race was run in two divisions in 1978 and 1982.

See also 

 Native Dancer Stakes
 Laurel Park Racecourse

References

 Native Dancer Stakes at Pedigree Query

Open middle distance horse races
Ungraded stakes races in the United States
Laurel Park Racecourse
Horse races in Maryland
Recurring sporting events established in 1966